Strathclyde Fire & Rescue was, between 1975 and 2013, the statutory fire and rescue service for the area of Strathclyde, Scotland. It was the largest fire and rescue service in Scotland, and one of the largest in Europe. Its territory ranged from the densely populated Glasgow to remote rural and island communities. It was amalgamated into the single Scottish Fire and Rescue Service in April 2013.

History
Strathclyde Fire Brigade was formed in 1975 when control of fire services was passed from local authorities to the new Strathclyde Regional Council. When Strathclyde Regional Council was abolished in 1996 the twelve new unitary authorities that replaced it agreed to keep the fire service as it was.

In 2005, the name was changed to Strathclyde Fire & Rescue to reflect the change in the operations that the modern fire and rescue service undertook. That year a book called Everyday Heroes was launched detailing the work of Strathclyde Fire & Rescue over the past 30 years.

Amalgamation in 2013
Strathclyde Fire & Rescue, along with the other seven fire and rescue services across Scotland, was amalgamated into a single, new Scottish Fire and Rescue Service on 1 April 2013. This replaced the previous system of eight regional fire and rescue services across Scotland which had existed since 1975. The Scottish Fire and Rescue Service has its headquarters in Perth.

Appliances
Strathclyde Fire & Rescue had over 200 Appliances which includes Rescue Pumps, Aerial Rescue Pumps (ARP), Heavy Rescue Vehicle, Technical Support Unit, Major Incident Units and Water Rescue Units. Also the Volunteer Stations had Volunteer Support Units.

Stations
The service operated 111 fire stations.

Regional Fire and Rescue Services in Scotland 1975-2013
The following eight regional fire and rescue services (originally known as fire brigades) were merged on 1 April 2013, creating the Scottish Fire and Rescue Service:
Central Scotland Fire and Rescue Service
Dumfries and Galloway Fire and Rescue Service
Fife Fire and Rescue Service
Grampian Fire and Rescue Service
Highlands and Islands Fire and Rescue Service
Lothian and Borders Fire and Rescue Service
Strathclyde Fire and Rescue Service
Tayside Fire and Rescue Service

The same boundaries were also used for the eight territorial police forces, which were amalgamated into Police Scotland on 1 April 2013.

Gallery

See also
 Blues and twos
 Fire Services in Scotland
 FiReControl
 Fire apparatus
 Fire engine
 Fire
 Fire Museum
 Fire and Rescue Authority (Scotland)

References

Fire and rescue services of Scotland
Organisations based in South Lanarkshire
Argyll and Bute
West Dunbartonshire
East Dunbartonshire
Glasgow
Inverclyde
Renfrewshire
East Renfrewshire
North Lanarkshire
South Lanarkshire
East Ayrshire
North Ayrshire
South Ayrshire